The Andrew Neil Show is a BBC political programme presented by Andrew Neil. It was broadcast on BBC Two every Wednesday evening. It was launched on 4 September 2019 and returned for a second series on 8 January 2020. The show came off-air during the COVID-19 pandemic on 11 March 2020 and was then cancelled as a result of budget cuts at the BBC.

Background 
Neil's long-running politics and current affairs programme This Week ended in July 2019 following his decision to "step down from late-night broadcasting". His lunchtime Daily Politics show ended in 2018 after 15 years.

A programme, also called The Andrew Neil Show, aired on daytime BBC Two, three times per week on weekday afternoons during 1996, where viewers would have the opportunity to question newsmakers via phone, fax and email. The latter part of the programme was simulcast on BBC World, which gave it an international feel.

The second incarnation of The Andrew Neil Show was first announced on 29 August 2019 in a statement from the BBC's press office. Ahead of the announcement, Rob Burley, the editor of BBC live political programmes, tweeted a teaser of the programme's logo, a superimposed 'A' and 'N'. Upon announcement, Neil said: "I'm delighted to be fronting a weekly show in prime time on BBC Two that will be on top of the story, whatever direction it takes. The autumn of 2019 is destined to be one of the most intriguing and significant in British politics for at least a generation". Neil continued to present Politics Live on BBC Two every Thursday lunchtime in addition to the programme.

Format 
The Andrew Neil Show aired at 7 pm on Wednesdays and focused on Brexit. It rounded up political events of the week and featured interviews with key politicians. Other BBC journalists frequently appeared on the show to offer their analysis, with BBC political editor Laura Kuenssberg being the most frequent guest. Other journalists that appeared included Hugh Pym and Adam Fleming.

Episodes

Series 1

Series 2

Reception 
The Telegraph gave the programme five stars, saying "Neil is back and taking no nonsense from either the left or the right".

The first episode of the programme was watched by an average of 800,000 viewers. According to Neil, the programme "was beating Channel 4 News every time it was on".

Notes

References

External links 

2019 British television series debuts
2020 British television series endings
2010s British political television series
2020s British political television series
BBC television news shows
British political television series
English-language television shows
Television productions cancelled due to the COVID-19 pandemic